Kevin O'Hara (born 11 August 1998) is a Scottish professional footballer who plays as a striker for Dunfermline Athletic. O'Hara has previously played for Falkirk, East Fife, Stenhousemuir and Alloa Athletic.

Career
O'Hara was raised in the village of Fallin and attended Wallace High School in Stirling. Having spent time training with the Forth Valley Football Academy, he began his professional career with Falkirk, making his senior debut in a league game on 12 April 2015. After strong performances for the club's Development League team, he was in contention for a place in the squad for the 2015 Scottish Cup Final, although in the end he was not selected.

He spent a loan spell with East Fife between July 2016 and January 2017, scoring 3 goals in 19 appearances in all competitions.

In November 2017 he received an 8-match 'excessive misconduct' ban for abusing Dean Shiels about his disability during a game against Dunfermline Athletic.

On 13 August 2018, O'Hara joined League One club Stenhousemuir on a six-month loan deal. He was recalled on 3 January 2019.

O'Hara was released by Falkirk at the end of the 2018–19 season, following the club's relegation to League One.

In July 2019, O'Hara signed for Scottish Championship club Alloa Athletic. After an  impressive year with Alloa during which he scored 14 goals in 35 matches, O'Hara signed a three-year contract with Dunfermline Athletic on 10 July 2020.

International
O'Hara has been involved with Scotland at various youth age group levels. In October 2013, he became the first Forth Valley Academy player to be selected for a national squad.

Career statistics

References

External links

1998 births
Living people
Footballers from Stirling
Scottish footballers
Falkirk F.C. players
East Fife F.C. players
Stenhousemuir F.C. players
Alloa Athletic F.C. players
Dunfermline Athletic F.C. players
Scottish Professional Football League players
Association football forwards
Scotland youth international footballers